Carlo Cardascio (born 6 November 1979 in Bari, Italy) is an Italian footballer who currently plays as a midfielder for Italian club Bisceglie in Serie D.

References

External links
Profile at Lega-Calcio.it

1979 births
Living people
Italian footballers
Italy youth international footballers
Serie A players
Serie B players
Serie C players
Serie D players
Belgian Pro League players
A.S. Lodigiani players
S.S. Fidelis Andria 1928 players
U.S. Catanzaro 1929 players
Palermo F.C. players
R.A.E.C. Mons players
S.S.C. Bari players
A.S.D. Martina Calcio 1947 players
A.S. Bisceglie Calcio 1913 players
Expatriate footballers in Belgium
Italian expatriate footballers
Italian expatriate sportspeople in Belgium
Association football midfielders